The World Cyber Games 2002 was held in Daejeon, South Korea from the October 28th to the November 3rd. Total prize money was $300,000.

Official games

First-person shooter (FPS)
 Half-Life: Counter-Strike
 Quake III: Arena
 Unreal Tournament
 Halo

Real-Time Strategy (RTS)
 Age of Empires II: The Conquerors
 StarCraft: Brood War

Sport
 2002 FIFA World Cup

Results

World Cyber Games events
2002 in esports
2002 in South Korean sport
Esports in South Korea
Sport in Daejeon